USS Frances may refer to more than one United States Navy ship:

, a sloop in commission from 1813 to 1814
, a motorboat in non-commissioned service from 1917 to 1918

Frances, USS